Juan Sebastián Cabal and Robert Farah were the two-time defending champions, but chose not to compete.
The Argentinian team of Guido Andreozzi and Eduardo Schwank defeated Carlos Salamanca and João Souza 6-2, 6-4.

Seeds

Draw

Draw

References
 Main Draw

Seguros Bolivar Open Cali - Doubles
2013 Doubles
2013 in Colombian tennis